Herbaijum is a village in Waadhoeke municipality in the province Friesland of the Netherlands and had around 253 citizens in January 2014. Until 2018, the village was part of the Franekeradeel municipality.

History 
The village was first mentioned in the 13th century as Herbadingum, and means "settlement of the people of Herbad (person)". Herbaijum is a small terp (artificial living hill) village.

The stins Sikkema State was built in the 15th century or earlier. One of the inhabitants was Sicco van Goslinga, grietman (mayor/judge) of Frankeradeel and curator of the University of Franeker. In the late-18th century, the estate was torn down and replaced by a farm, and only the gate remains.

Herbaijum was home to 215 people in 1840.

Church
The church was built in the Middle Ages; general estimates point to establishment around the second half of the 13th century. It was dedicated to Nicolaos van Myra.

A near complete restoration of the church, except for the north wall, was undertaken in 1872 under the guidance of architect P.J. Jaarsma. The north wall consists largely of yellow, mediaeval bricks—called kloostermoppen—which were locally repaired. Any missing ones were replaced by similar small, yellow bricks made locally in Frisia. The tower on the west side was probably built in the 1920s, and has a constricted, octagonal spire and is roofed with slate tiles.

According to a gable stone, the church was again restored in 1985.

Demographics

Population 
 1954 - 278
 1959 - 273
 1964 - 255
 1969 - 290
 1973 - 241
 2003 - 294

Notable people 
 Sicco van Goslinga, (1664–1730) statesman
 Jopie Huisman (1922–2000), autodidactic painter and rag-and-bone man. Huisman ran a scrap metal company in Herbaijum and is buried in the village.

Gallery

References

External links

Waadhoeke
Populated places in Friesland